Hold Everything! is a musical comedy with lyrics by Lew Brown and B. G. de Sylva, music by Ray Henderson, and has an accompanying book by John McGowan and B. G. de Sylva.

Produced by Alex A. Aarons and Vinton Freedley, the Broadway production opened on 10 October 1928 at the Broadhurst Theatre for a total run of 409 performances. The cast included Bert Lahr, Jack Whiting, Ona Munson and Victor Moore.

Bert Lahr's career as a star began with this show. This most famous song from the show is “You're the Cream in My Coffee”. In 1930, Warner Brothers produced a movie version Hold Everything filmed entirely in Technicolor. Survives in Black and White.

Songs

Act I
 We’re Calling on Mr. Brooks
 An Outdoor man for My Indoor Sports
 Footwork
 You're the Cream in My Coffee
 When I Love, I Love
 Too Good To Be True
 To Know You Is To Love You
 Don't Hold Everything

Act II
 For Sweet Charity's Sake
 Genealogy
 Oh, Gosh
 It's All Over but the Shoutin’

External links
 

1928 musicals
Broadway musicals
Musicals set in the Roaring Twenties